Two Hearts is the third and final studio album by Australian rock group Men at Work, released on 23 April 1985. Drummer Jerry Speiser and bassist John Rees had left the band prior to the album's production, while guitarist Ron Strykert left the band during recording sessions. Touring behind the album saw sole remaining members Colin Hay and Greg Ham joined by guest musicians. It peaked at No. 16 in Australia, and No. 50 on the US chart.

Background
During 1984 the band took a break as members pursued other interests. Upon reconvening later that year, tensions during rehearsals between Hay and Speiser over songwriting and the band's management led to a split in the band. Both Rees and Speiser were told they were "not required", as Hay, Ham and Strykert used session musicians in their stead: primarily Jeremy Alsop on bass guitar (ex-Ram Band, Pyramid, Broderick Smith) and Mark Kennedy on drums (Spectrum, Ayers Rock, Marcia Hines).  Strykert, though credited as a full band member on the finished album, left the group shortly before the album sessions ended, appearing on eight of the ten tracks.

Reception

Cash Box said "Australia's most successful (in America) pop band returns from a lengthy hiatus with a well-polished and oft times hard rocking effort which lends meat to the Men At Work legacy. Colin Hay's quirky and distinctive vocals and lyrics are still intact and the groups' execution is much improved. Look for a good response to the singles 'Everything I Need' and 'Man with Two Hearts'."

In a brief retrospective review, Allmusic'''s Stephen Thomas Erlewine called it "a bland, synthesized variation on mainstream pop, featuring none of the melodic sensibilities or subtle humor of their first two albums."

Tour
Hay and Ham hired new band mates to tour in support of Two Hearts, with Alsop and Kennedy joined by James Black on guitar and keyboards (Mondo Rock, The Black Sorrows). Soon after a third guitarist, Colin Bayley (Mi-Sex), was added and Kennedy was replaced on drums by Chad Wackerman (Frank Zappa). Australian singers Kate Ceberano and Renée Geyer had also worked on the album and performed live as guest vocalists.
On 13 July 1985 Men at Work performed three tracks for the Oz for Africa concert (part of the global Live Aid program)—"Maria", "Overkill", and an unreleased one, "The Longest Night". They were broadcast in Australia (on both Seven Network and Nine Network) and on MTV in the US. "Maria" and "Overkill" were also broadcast by American Broadcasting Company (ABC) during their Live Aid telecast. Ham left during the band's time touring behind the album. The final Men at Work performances during 1985 had jazz saxophonist Paul Williamson (The Black Sorrows), replacing Ham. By early 1986 the band was defunct and Hay started recording his first solo album, Looking for Jack'' (January 1987), which had Alsop and Wackerman as session musicians.

Track listing

Personnel
Men at Work
Greg Ham - keyboards; saxophone; drum programming on "Giving Up", "Snakes and Ladders", and "Still Life"; lead vocals on "Giving Up", "Stay at Home", and "Still Life"; backing vocals on "Everything I Need"
Colin Hay - acoustic guitar; electric guitar (except on "Sail to You", "Hard Luck Story", and "Still Life"); drum programming (except on "Snakes and Ladders" and "Still Life"); lead vocals (except on "Giving Up", "Stay at Home", and "Still Life"); backing vocals; additional keyboards and marimba on "Man With Two Hearts"; electric sitar on "Maria"; bass and piano on "Hard Luck Story"; drums on "Everything I Need" and "Hard Luck Story"
Ron Strykert - electric and steel guitars (except on "Everything I Need" and "Snakes and Ladders"); acoustic guitar on "Maria"; bass on "Man With Two Hearts"

Session musicians
Jeremy Alsop - bass (except on "Man With Two Hearts", "Everything I Need", and "Hard Luck Story")
James Black - guitar on "Snakes and Ladders"
George Butrumlis - piano accordion on "Maria"
Kate Ceberano - backing vocals on "Giving Up" and "Stay at Home"
Phil Colson - slide guitar on "Everything I Need"
Paul Gadsby - bass on "Everything I Need"
Renée Geyer - lead vocal on "Maria"
J.J. Hacket - drums and percussion on "Maria"
Mark Kennedy - percussion; drums on "Man With Two Hearts", "Giving Up", "Sail to You", and "Stay at Home"

Production
Colin Hay, Greg Ham - Producers
Russell Deppeler - Management
Colin Hay, Greg Ham, Bob Clearmountain - Mixing, except "Children on Parade"
Tim Kramer, Colin Hay, Greg Ham - Mixing, "Children on Parade"

Charts

References

1985 albums
Men at Work albums
Columbia Records albums